Rock & Roll Time is the 41st and final studio album by American singer Jerry Lee Lewis, released on November 7, 2014, by Vanguard Records. The album featured several big name friends as musicians including Keith Richards, Band guitarist Robbie Robertson, Neil Young and Nils Lofgren. The album peaked at number 33 on Billboard Top Rock Albums chart and number 30 on Billboard Independent Albums chart.

Track listing
"Rock and Roll Time" – (Kris Kristofferson, Roger McGuinn, Bob Neuwirth)
"Little Queenie" – (Chuck Berry)
"Stepchild" – (Bob Dylan) 
"Sick and Tired"– (Chris Kenner, Dave Bartholomew)
"Bright Lights, Big City" – (Jimmy Reed)
"Folsom Prison Blues" – (Johnny Cash) 
"Keep Me in Mind" – (previously unpublished song by Mack Vickery)
"Mississippi Kid" – (Al Kooper, Bob Burns, Ronnie Van Zant)
"Blues Like Midnight" – (Jimmie Rodgers) 
"Here Comes That Rainbow Again" – (Kris Kristofferson) 
"Promised Land" – (Chuck Berry)

References

External links

Jerry Lee Lewis albums
2014 albums
Vanguard Records albums